Derya Büyükuncu (born 2 July 1976) is a six-time Olympic backstroke and butterfly swimmer from Turkey. His coach is Zehra Büyükuncu.

He participated in six consecutive Summer Olympic Games: 1992 Barcelona, 1996 Atlanta, 2000 Sydney, 2004 Athens, 2008 Beijing, 2012 London. He is one of the first two (together with Lars Frölander) swimmers to participate in six Olympic Games.

Early years
At the age of nine, Büyükuncu became a national swimmer, and won a bronze medal in the 12-year-age category at the 1985 Balkan Swimming Championships held in Bulgaria. At the 1987 Balkan Championships held in Izmir, he won five gold medals. He repeated his five-fold gold medal performance at the 1989 Balkan Championships in Greece. In 1990, he took three gold medals at the Balkan Junior Championships held in Romania.

Büyükuncu earned two gold medals at the 1991 European Junior Swimming Championships in Antwerp, Belgium. That year, he was named "Sportsman of the Year" by Milliyet. In 1992, he won the gold medal at the European Junior Swimming Championships held in Leeds, United Kingdom setting a new European juniors record.  In so doing, he became the first ever Turkish swimmer to hold a European juniors record.

Büyükuncu set a Games record in the 200m backstroke event at the 1993 Mediterranean Games in France and won the gold medal. The same year, he won two gold medals at the U.S. Open in Ann Arbor, Michigan and broke the record in the 100 yard backstroke event, beating world champion and record holder Jeff Rouse. Setting a record in the 100 yard backstroke, that is as of 2012 still unbroken, and a record in the 100 yard freestyle, Büyükuncu won two gold medals at the 1994 U.S. High School Swimming Championships. In 1993, he was named the "Male High School Swimmer of the Year" by the National Interscholastic Swimming Coaches Association (NISCA) in the USA.  He became the first ever Turkish swimmer to appear on the cover of Swimming World Magazine''' in August 1994.

Between 1994 and 1998, Büyükuncu set University of Michigan records in the 100m backstroke, 200m backstroke and 100 m butterfly events. In that time span, he set Big Ten Conference records in 100m and 200m backstroke, and was named the "Most Successful Swimmer" of Big Ten Conference in 1996 and 1998.

Athletic career
In 1996, Derya Büyükuncu earned five gold medals at the 1996 Balkan Championships in Romania. He took the bronze medal at the 1997 Mediterranean Games in Bari, Italy. Winning a gold medal at the 1998 World Swimming Cup in Canada, he became the first ever Turkish swimmer to win an international competition.

In the 100m backstroke event, he earned a silver medal at the European Short Course Swimming Championships 1999 in Lisbon, Portugal and a bronze medal at the 2000 European Aquatics Championships held in Helsinki, Finland.

As of 2012, Büyükuncu holds national records in 50m, 100m and 200m backstroke events set in 2009. He has been a Turkish national team member for more than 25 years.

Büyükuncu qualified to participate at the 2012 Summer Olympics.  2012 Summer Olympics was his sixth consecutive Olympics.

Media career
Derya Büyükuncu participated at the Yok Böyle Dans (Turkish version of Dancing with the Stars) TV Show in 2010 and he got the fourth place. He also participated at the Survivor Turkey TV Show in 2011 and ended up winning the title of "Sole Champion Survivor".

Achievements

Recognitions
 1991 Milliyet'' "Sportsman of the Year"
 1993 National Interscholastic Swimming Coaches Association (NISCA) "Male High School Swimmer of the Year"
 1998 "Most Successful Swimmer" of the Big Ten Conference

References

External links
Personal website

1976 births
Living people
Turkish male backstroke swimmers
Turkish male butterfly swimmers
Olympic swimmers of Turkey
Winners in the Survivor franchise
Swimmers at the 1992 Summer Olympics
Swimmers at the 1996 Summer Olympics
Swimmers at the 2000 Summer Olympics
Swimmers at the 2004 Summer Olympics
Swimmers at the 2008 Summer Olympics
Michigan Wolverines men's swimmers
Galatasaray Swimming swimmers
Sportspeople from Istanbul
Survivor (franchise) winners
Kadıköy Anadolu Lisesi alumni
Swimmers at the 2012 Summer Olympics
Medalists at the FINA World Swimming Championships (25 m)
European Aquatics Championships medalists in swimming
Mediterranean Games gold medalists for Turkey
Mediterranean Games silver medalists for Turkey
Mediterranean Games bronze medalists for Turkey
Swimmers at the 1991 Mediterranean Games
Swimmers at the 1993 Mediterranean Games
Swimmers at the 1997 Mediterranean Games
Mediterranean Games medalists in swimming